Indore-3 Assembly constituency is one of the 230 Vidhan Sabha (Legislative Assembly) constituencies of Madhya Pradesh state in central India.

Overview 

Indore-3 Assembly constituency is one of the 8 Vidhan Sabha constituencies located in Indore district which comes under Indore (Lok Sabha constituency). Constituency includes Ward No.18, 26 to 30, 41 to 45 and 57 to 61 of Indore city.

Members of Legislative Assembly

See also

 Indore
 Indore (Lok Sabha constituency)

References

Politics of Indore
Assembly constituencies of Madhya Pradesh